RIS may refer to:

 Radio Information Service, a reading service for the blind in Pennsylvania, US
 Radiological information system
 Radiologically isolated syndrome, suggesting multiple sclerosis
 Rail Integration System, for attaching accessories on firearms
 Microsoft Remote Installation Services, booting computers via PXE
 Reparto Informazioni e Sicurezza, a military intelligence agency of Italy, see SIOS
 Republik Indonesia Serikat (Republic of the United States of Indonesia)
 RIS Info, later RDS Info, Canadian sports broadcaster
 Reviving the Islamic Spirit, an Islamic conference in Canada
 Riverside Indian School
 RIS (file format), for citation programs
 RIS Delitti Imperfetti, an Italian TV series
 R. I. S. – Die Sprache der Toten, a German TV series
 R.I.S, police scientifique, a French TV series
 Rishiri Airport, Japan, IATA airport code
 Rishton railway station, England, station code
 Ruamrudee International School, Thailand
 Russian imperial stout, a strong dark beer

See also
 ris (disambiguation)
 R1S, an SUV by Rivian 
 RI (disambiguation)